Leather-Nose is a 1936 novel by the French writer Jean de La Varende, about Achille Perrier de La Genevraye, an officer during the Napoleonic Wars and the author's grand uncle. An English translation by R. Wills Thomas was published in 1938.

The book was the basis for the 1952 film Leathernose, directed by Yves Allégret and starring Jean Marais. François Truffaut prepared a film adaptation in 1984, but was too weak and died before it could be made.

References

1936 French novels
French novels adapted into films
French-language novels
Novels set during the Napoleonic Wars